The Norwegian Tax Administration is a government agency responsible for resident registration (National Population Register) and tax collection in Norway. The agency is subordinate to the Ministry of Finance and is based at Helsfyr in Oslo. It is organized in six regional organizations, based in Oslo, Skien, Bergen, Trondheim, Mo i Rana and Tromsø, in addition to local tax offices.

References

External links
 Official English site

Government agencies of Norway
Taxation in Norway
Revenue services
Civil registries
Organisations based in Oslo